S. dubia may refer to:
 Sepia dubia, a cuttlefish species native to the southeastern Atlantic Ocean
 Schoeniparus dubia, the rusty-capped fulvetta, a bird species found in Bhutan, China, India, Laos, Myanmar and Vietnam
 Sphyraena dubia, the Guachanche barracuda, an ocean-going fish species
 Staehelina dubia, a plant species in the genus Staehelina